The Microregion of Fernandópolis is located on the northwest of São Paulo state, Brazil, and is made up of 13 municipalities. It belongs to the Mesoregion of São José do Rio Preto.

The microregion has a population of 104,623 inhabitants, in an area of 2,811.7 km²

Municipalities 
The microregion consists of the following municipalities, listed below with their 2010 Census populations (IBGE/2010):

Estrela d'Oeste: 8,208
Fernandópolis: 64,696
Guarani d'Oeste: 1,970
Indiaporã: 3,903
Macedônia: 3,664
Meridiano: 3,885
Mira Estrela: 2,820
Ouroeste: 8,405
Pedranópolis: 2,558
São João das Duas Pontes: 2,566
Turmalina: 1,978

References

Fernandopolis